André Frédéric Hartmann (19 October 1772 – 1 May 1861) was a French manufacturer and politician.

Life and career 
Hartmann was born in 1772 in Colmar, in the Haut-Rhin department in northeastern France.

He was the general councillor of Haut-Rhin and a deputy from Haut-Rhin at the Chamber of Deputies from 1830 to 1845, seating within the majority backing the July Monarchy.
He was a Peer of France between 1845 and 1848.

He was made an officier of the Legion of Honour in 1844.

He died in 1861 in Munster, Haut-Rhin at the age of 88.

References

Further reading 
  
  Gérard Leser, "André Frédéric Hartmann", in

External links 
  "Hartmann, André Frédéric" on Sycomore

1772 births
1861 deaths
People from Colmar
Politicians from Grand Est
Members of the 1st Chamber of Deputies of the July Monarchy
Members of the 2nd Chamber of Deputies of the July Monarchy
Members of the 3rd Chamber of Deputies of the July Monarchy
Members of the 4th Chamber of Deputies of the July Monarchy
Members of the 5th Chamber of Deputies of the July Monarchy
Members of the Chamber of Peers of the July Monarchy
French general councillors
Officiers of the Légion d'honneur